Somarasampettai  is a village in the Srirangam taluk of Tiruchirappalli district in Tamil Nadu, India.

Demographics 

As per the 2011 census, Somarasampettai had a population of 8,774 with 4,352 males and 4,422 females. According to 2001 census the sex ratio was 1029 and the literacy rate, 85.26.

References 

 

 

Villages in Tiruchirappalli district